August W. Flamme (January 1, 1884 – February 13, 1961) was a provincial politician from Alberta, Canada. He served as a member of the Legislative Assembly of Alberta from 1935 to 1940 sitting with the Social Credit caucus in government.

Political career
Flamme first ran for a seat to the Alberta Legislature as a Social Credit candidate in the 1935 general election in the electoral district of Cypress. He defeated incumbent Perren Baker and two other candidates in a landslide to pick up the district for his party.  In the 1940 general election he was defeated by independent candidate Fay Jackson.  He died in 1961 at Bow Island Hospital in Bow Island, Alberta.

References

External links
Legislative Assembly of Alberta Members Listing

Alberta Social Credit Party MLAs
1884 births
1961 deaths
People from Newton, Iowa
American emigrants to Canada
People from the County of Forty Mile No. 8